The filmography of Denis O'Hare comprises both film and television roles. In a career spanning over three decades, he has appeared in overall 34 feature films, seven television movies and eighteen television series. For his performance in the first season of American Horror Story, he was nominated for the Primetime Emmy Award for Outstanding Supporting Actor in a Miniseries or a Movie in 2012. As part of the ensemble cast in the films Milk and Dallas Buyers Club, he was nominated for the Screen Actors Guild Award for Outstanding Performance by a Cast in a Motion Picture.

In addition to his screen appearances, O'Hare has also starred in multiple productions within the theater arts. For his performances in Take Me Out and Assassins, he won the Tony Award for Best Featured Actor in a Play and was nominated for the Tony Award for Best Featured Actor in a Musical, respectively.

Film

Television

Stage

See also
 List of awards and nominations received by Denis O'Hare

References
 
 
 
 

Male actor filmographies
American filmographies